USS Screven (AK-210) was an  that was constructed for the US Navy during the closing period of World War II. She served in the Pacific Ocean theatre of operations and returned home in 1946 to be placed into the "mothball fleet" where she remained until sold in 1947 for commercial maritime service.

Construction 
Screven was laid down under US Maritime Commission (MARCOM) contract, MC hull 2164, on 11 July 1944, by Leathem D. Smith Shipbuilding Company, Sturgeon Bay, Wisconsin; launched on 30 November 1944; sponsored by Mrs. Harold Roeth; acquired on 3 July 1945; and commissioned on 2 August 1945.

Service history

World War II-related service
After shakedown, Screven arrived at Gulfport, Mississippi, on 31 August 1945 to load cargo. She sailed on 21 September and, after stops at the Panama Canal Zone and Pearl Harbor, arrived at Guam on 16 November. Departing from Guam on 19 December, the ship arrived at San Francisco, on 9 January 1946 and proceeded to the US East Coast.

Post-war inactivation
Screven arrived at Baltimore, Maryland, on 10 April for inactivation, and was decommissioned on 30 April. She was redelivered to the Maritime Commission on 7 May 1946 and struck from the Navy List on 8 May.

Merchant service
The freighter was purchased 26 February 1947, for $693,862, by the Norwegian firm of Benham and Boyesin, Inc. She was renamed Norlindo.

Peruvian Navy service
In 1959 she became the Peruvian Navy transport, Ilo (A 133). She was sold to Spanish shipbreakers in 1968.

Notes 

Citations

Bibliography 

Online resources

External links

 

Alamosa-class cargo ships
Ships built in Sturgeon Bay, Wisconsin
1944 ships
World War II auxiliary ships of the United States
Screven County, Georgia